Cisse Sandra (born 16 December 2003) is a Belgian professional footballer who plays as a midfielder for Club Brugge.

Club career
Sandra began his career at the youth academy of Club Brugge. On 22 August 2020, Sandra made his debut for Brugge's reserve side, Club NXT in the Belgian First Division B against RWDM47. He came on as a 79th minute substitute as NXT lost 0–2.

Sandra scored his first professional goal on 30 August 2020 against Lommel. His 80th-minute goal gave NXT the lead but the match soon ended 2–2.

Career statistics

Club

Honours
Club Brugge
 Belgian Super Cup: 2021

References

External links
Profile at the Club Brugge website

2003 births
Living people
Belgian footballers
Belgium youth international footballers
Association football midfielders
Club NXT players
Club Brugge KV players
Challenger Pro League players
Belgian Pro League players